Vivian Harold Potter (23 October 1878 – 19 November 1968) was a New Zealand Member of Parliament, miner, trade unionist, and soldier.

Private life
Potter was born in Hamilton in 1878, the son of Albert Potter. His mother was Catherine Potter (née Whitehouse), Albert Potter's second wife. Albert Potter left his first wife in 1862 in Hobart when he discovered that both she and Catherine Whitehouse were pregnant with his children; he secretly took four of their five children with them to Auckland. His first wife tracked him down in Mount Eden in 1892.

Vivian Potter mostly lived in Auckland during his early life. He fought in the Second Boer War with the 7th Contingent for about two years; he was a Squadron Quartermaster Sergeant with registration number 4045.

After the Boer War, he married Lillah Coleman at Waihi in January 1904. He was a miner at Waihi and was a member of the Waihi Miners' Union, but opposed the 1912 strike. After the strike was over, he travelled the North Island and lectured on labour arbitration and conciliation.

He was a Second Lieutenant in World War I. He was granted indefinite leave from military service in March 1918 because he suffered from sciatica.

Political career 

Potter served on the Waihi Borough Council. He chaired the Waihi school committee for some time, and was on the advisory committee for the Technical School.

Potter represented the Roskill electorate for the Reform Party in the New Zealand House of Representatives from 1919 to 1928. In the 1931 election, he was one of five candidates in Eden and came last.

He died on 19 November 1968 and was buried at Mangere Lawn Cemetery.

References

1878 births
1968 deaths
Reform Party (New Zealand) MPs
Local politicians in New Zealand
New Zealand military personnel of the Second Boer War
New Zealand military personnel of World War I
New Zealand miners
New Zealand trade unionists
People from Hamilton, New Zealand
Members of the New Zealand House of Representatives
New Zealand MPs for Auckland electorates
Burials at Mangere Lawn Cemetery
Unsuccessful candidates in the 1928 New Zealand general election
Unsuccessful candidates in the 1931 New Zealand general election
Unsuccessful candidates in the 1935 New Zealand general election